Mikhoel Felzenbaum (born 1951 in Vasylkiv, Ukraine, USSR) is a postmodernist Yiddish novelist, poet and playwright.

He grew up in the Bessarabian city of Florești. He studied stage directing, theatre and art history in Leningrad and, from 1969 to 1973, worked as a director in the national theater of Bălți. In the mid-1980s, he began to publish his work in the Yiddish journal Sovetish Heymland. In 1988, he founded the Jewish theater of Bălți, for which he directed a number of plays in Yiddish. He was first chairman of the city's Jewish cultural society. His plays have been discussed in a conference in Alsace

After immigrating to Israel in 1991, Felsenbaum published several volumes of poetry and prose in Yiddish, and was co-founder of the almanac, Naye Vegn. He has had work published in various Yiddish journals: Di Goldene Keyt and ToplPunkt (Israel), Di Pen (Oxford), Oyfn Shvel and Yidishe Kultur (New York). His novel, Shabesdike Shvebelekh, is one of the only postmodern works written in Yiddish, and is about to be translated into Hebrew, English, German, Russian and French. It was discussed at a conference in Oxford 

Mikhoel Felzenbaum has programmes on the weekly Yiddish language series broadcast on the Reka radio station based in Israel.

Bibliography
 
 עס קומט דער טאָג (Es kumt der tog: lider; Day arrives: Poems). Jerusalem; Tel-Aviv: Šmuel un Riwke Hurwitz Literatur-Fond, 1992.
 אַ ליבע-רעגן (A libe regn: lider; Rain of love: Poems). Tel Aviv: I. L. Peretz Farlag, 1995.
 דער נאַכט-מלאך (Der nakht-malekh; Angel of the night). Short stories and plays. Tel Aviv: I. L. Peretz Farlag, 1997.
 און איצט איך בין דײַן ניגון (Un itst ikh bin dayn nign; And now I am your melody). Poems. Bilingual edition in Yiddish and in Hebrew translation. Tel Aviv: H. Leyvik Farlag, 1998.
 Jiddische Texte: Solothurner Literaturtage, 10-12 Mai 2002. Conversation among Michael Felsenbaum, Lev Berinsky, and Gennady Estraikh. Edited and with an introduction ("Einführung zur Jiddischen Literatur") by Astrid Starck. Solothurn: Solothurner Literaturtage, 2002. In Yiddish and German. .
 שבתדיקע שװעבעלעך (Shabesdike shṿebelekh: roman; Sabbath matches: Novel). Tel Aviv: H. Leyvik Farlag, 2004.
 אין דרעזדען בײַ דער לאַבע (In Drezden, bay der Labe =Dresden an der Labe; In Dresden on the Elbe). Poems. Bilingual edition in Yiddish and in German translation. Tel Aviv: Menora Verlag, 2006.
 Субботние спички (роман, перевёл с идиша Вэлвл Чернин), РИЦ Медиа Формат: Moscow, 2006. 
 בענקשאַפֿט (Benkshaft; Longing). Poems. Tel Aviv: Menora Verlag,  2007.

References

External links 
  
   (Astrid Starck-Adler), Universite de Haute Alsace, May 2003 
 
 Рецензия на русский перевод книги «Субботние спички»
 Рецензия на роман «Субботние спички» (иврит)
 Автобиографические заметки на идише,
 английском и французском языках

Israeli male dramatists and playwrights
Soviet dramatists and playwrights
Moldovan dramatists and playwrights
Male dramatists and playwrights
Yiddish-language playwrights
1951 births
Living people
People from Vasylkiv
Jewish Ukrainian writers
Soviet Jews
Moldovan Jews
Soviet emigrants to Israel
Moldovan emigrants to Israel
Moldovan male writers